Olearia persoonioides is a species of flowering plant in the family Asteraceae and is endemic to Tasmania. They are shiny green on the upper surface and covered with silvery hairs on the lower side. The heads or daisy-like "flowers" are arranged in leafy panicles with 3 to 8 white ray florets surrounding 10 to 12 disc florets. Flowering occurs in January.

It was first formally described in 1836 by Augustin Pyramus de Candolle who gave it the name Eurybia persoonioides in his Prodromus Systematis Naturalis Regni Vegetabilis from specimens collected by Allan Cunningham. In 1867, George Bentham changed the name to Olearia persoonioides in Flora Australiensis. 

Olearia persoonioides grows in wet forest in Tasmania.

References

persoonioides
Flora of Tasmania
Plants described in 1836
Taxa named by Augustin Pyramus de Candolle